Ocellomma is a genus of lichen-forming fungi in the family Roccellaceae. The genus was circumscribed in 2014 by Damien Ertz and Anders Tehler, following a molecular phylogenetic-based revision of the Roccellaceae. The type species, O. picconianum, was originally named Lecania picconiana by Francesco Baglietto in 1862, described from specimens collected in Italy. DNA-based phylogenetic analysis showed that it occupied a distinct genetic lineage, deserving of recognition as a new genus. The genus name Ocellomma alludes to the whitish rims on the small ascomata that contrast with the s, giving them the appearance of small eyes.

Ocellomma rediuntum was proposed for addition to the genus in 2020. This lichen has an unusual disjunct distribution, occurring in both the coast of California, and in Australasia, including Kangaroo Island in South Australia, Victoria, and Tasmania. Both Ocellomma species are crustose and grow on bark.

Species
Ocellomma picconianum 
Ocellomma rediuntum

References

Roccellaceae
Arthoniomycetes genera
Lichen genera
Taxa described in 2014